Mo'men Soliman (born 21 March 1974) is an Egyptian football manager and former player. He most recently managed Al-Shorta in the Iraqi Premier League. He played as a left-back for Zamalek SC and Suez Club in Egypt, for De Graafschap in the Netherlands, and for OFI Crete and Agios Nikolaos in Greece.

Managerial career

El-Entag El-Harby
Soliman was appointed manager of El-Entag El-Harby in 2015. He made a big impact after winning the Egyptian Second Division in 2014–15 season and reached first division.

Zamalek
Soliman took Zamalek command position as a caretaker, his first match was against Ismaily (Semi-Final of 2016 Egyptian cup), Zamalek did a great performance and won 4–0, his second match was the cup final against Al Ahly, he led the team to win 3–1 and claim the fourth cup title in a row.

He also led the team to the 2016 CAF Champions League Final against Mamelodi Sundowns before the team lose by 3–1 in aggregate.

Al-Shorta
On 15 August 2021, Soliman is appointed as the head coach of Al-Shorta, evolving in the Iraqi Premier League. It is the first foreign team he has coached. In the 2021–22 season, Soliman succeeds with Al-Shorta in setting a record for the earliest league title win (seven rounds remaining). This achievement earned him a contract extension.

Managerial statistics

Honours

Player
Zamalek
African Cup of Champions Clubs: 1996
CAF Super Cup: 1997

Manager 
El-Entag El-Harby
 Egyptian Second Division: 2014–15 (reached first division)

Zamalek
Egypt Cup: 2016

Al-Shorta
Iraqi Premier League: 2021–22
Iraqi Super Cup: 2022

References

External links
 

1974 births
Living people
Association football fullbacks
Egyptian footballers
Zamalek SC players
De Graafschap players
OFI Crete F.C. players
Agios Nikolaos F.C. players
Egyptian expatriate footballers
Expatriate footballers in the Netherlands
Egyptian expatriate sportspeople in Greece
Egyptian expatriate sportspeople in the Netherlands
Expatriate footballers in Greece
Eredivisie players
Egyptian Premier League players
Egyptian football managers
Zamalek SC managers
Smouha SC managers
Al-Shorta SC managers
Iraqi Premier League managers
Egyptian expatriate football managers
Egyptian expatriate sportspeople in Iraq
Expatriate football managers in Iraq